Dagze or Dazi may refer to:

Dagzê County, county in Tibet
Dagze Lake, in Tibet
Dagzê, Nyingchi, village in Nyingchi County